The Electricity Generation Company Malawi Limited (Egenco) is a parastatal company whose primary purpose is to generate electric power for use in Malawi and for possible sale to neighboring countries.

Location
The headquarters of Egenco are in Chayamba Building, at 7 Victoria Avenue, in the city of Blantyre, the financial capital and largest city in Malawi. The geographical coordinates of Egenco headquarters are: 15°47'13.0"S, 35°00'20.0"E (Latitude:-15.786944; Longitude:35.005556).

Overview and history
Egenco was established when the Electricity Supply Commission of Malawi (ESCOM), hitherto the electricity monopoly in the country, was split, with Egenco assuming the role of electricity generation, and ESCOM retaining the roles of bulk purchase, transmission and distribution. Egenco became operational on 1 January 2017.

Operations
Egenco is responsible for the operation, maintenance, and improvement of the power stations owned by the Malawian government. These include both hydroelectric and thermal power stations.

Operational stations
 Kapichira Hydroelectric Power Station: 128 megawatts
 Nkhula A Hydroelectric Power Station: 24 megawatts
 Nkhula A Hydroelectric Power Station: 100 megawatts
 Tedzani I Hydroelectric Power Station: 20 megawatts
 Tedzani II Hydroelectric Power Station: 20 megawatts
 Tedzani III Hydroelectric Power Station: 52.7 megawatts
 Tedzani IV Hydroelectric Power Station: 19 megawatts

Power stations in development
 Kammwamba Thermal Power Station: 300 megawatts

Governance
Egenco is governed by a seven-person board of directors. As of January 2018, the following comprised the Egenco board.

See also

List of power stations in Uganda
Electricity Regulatory Authority
Energy in Uganda

References

External links
 Egenco Homepage

Energy companies of Malawi
Government of Malawi
Electric power infrastructure in Malawi
Hydroelectric power companies
Hydroelectricity in Malawi
Energy companies established in 2017
2017 establishments in Malawi